Milan St. Protić (born 28 July 1957) is a Serbian historian, politician and diplomat who served as the Ambassador of the Federal Republic of Yugoslavia to the United States,  Switzerland and Liechtenstein. He was also the Mayor of Belgrade in 2000/01.

Early life and education
He was born in a prominent Serbian family of politicians and intellectuals. His great grandfather Stojan Protić was Serbian statesman and the Prime Minister of Yugoslavia (1918–1920). His grandfather Milan St. Protić was the Governor of the Yugoslav Central Bank (1939–1940) and was the member of the Yugoslav cabinet (1941). His father was a renowned Yugoslav sportswriter and FIFA official.

Protić graduated from the University of Belgrade's Law School in 1980, but was not allowed to pursue an academic career for political reasons. Leaving the country, he continued graduate studies in the History department at the University of California, Santa Barbara where he received M.A. (1982) and Ph.D. (1987).

Upon his return to Yugoslavia, Milan St. Protić entered the Institute for Balkan Studies as a Research Fellow. He was a visiting professor at UC Santa Barbara (1991–1992). He also gave lectures at universities in Thessaloniki, Paris, Cambridge, London, Harvard, Washington, D.C. and Toronto. He is the author of several books about Serbian and Yugoslav 19th and 20th century history.

Political career
From 1991, St. Protić took an active part in the opposition movement against the regime of Slobodan Milošević. He became one of the leading figures of the opposition movement and a member of its leadership in 1998.

On October 5, 2000, he was elected Mayor of Belgrade as the first official-elect of the new democratic government.

In February 2001, Milan St. Protić was appointed Ambassador to the United States, but was recalled after six months due to public criticism of the Yugoslav President Vojislav Koštunica and his policies. In following years he was the Deputy Chairman of the Christian Democratic Party of Serbia (DHSS). 

In January 2009, Protić was appointed Ambassador to Switzerland and Liechtenstein.

Personal life
Milan St. Protić is married and father of three daughters. He is a self-described Serbian nationalist and Serbian Orthodox Christian.

See also
 Mayor of Belgrade

References

External links 

 Biography and political life until 2000, interview

1957 births
Living people
Diplomats from Belgrade
Christian Democratic Party of Serbia politicians
Mayors of Belgrade
University of Belgrade Faculty of Law alumni
University of California, Santa Barbara alumni
20th-century Serbian historians
Eastern Orthodox Christians from Serbia
Ambassadors of Serbia and Montenegro to the United States
Ambassadors of Serbia to Liechtenstein
Ambassadors of Serbia to Switzerland